Charles Altamont Doyle (25 March 1832 – 10 October 1893) was an illustrator, watercolourist and civil servant. A member of an artistic family, he is remembered today primarily for being the father of Sir Arthur Conan Doyle, creator of Sherlock Holmes.

Family background 
Doyle was the son of artist John Doyle, the political cartoonist known as H.B., and Marianna Conan Doyle. Three of his older brothers in the family of seven children were artists: James William Edmund Doyle, Richard "Dickie" Doyle, and Henry Edward Doyle.
The family was of Irish background but Doyle was born and raised in England. Similarly to his elder brother Richard, he had no formal training, apart from lessons in his father's studio.

Life and career 

In 1849 he moved to Edinburgh, to take up a post at the Scottish Office of Works where he was employed as an assistant surveyor. On 31 July 1855, he married Mary Foley (1837–1920), his landlady's daughter. Together they became parents to several children (sources debate whether it was nine or ten), seven of whom survived childhood, including Arthur Conan Doyle, John Francis Innes Hay (known as Innes or Duff), and Jane Adelaide Rose (known as Ida).

To support his growing family, in addition to full-time employment he continued to produce illustrations for at least 23 books, as well as several designs for journals. These included editions of The Pilgrim's Progress (1860) and Robinson Crusoe (1861), Beauty and the Beast (late 1860s), The Queens of Society (1872), and Our Trip to Blunderland (1877) a parody of Lewis Carroll.

Although he exhibited at the Royal Scottish Academy, Doyle was not as successful an artist as he wanted, and had depression and alcoholism. His paintings, which were generally of fairies, such as In the shade or A Dance Around The Moon, or similar fantasy scenes, reflected his mood, becoming more macabre over time.

In 1876 he was dismissed from his job and given a pension; in 1881 Doyle's family sent him to Blairerno House, a "home for Intemperate Gentlemen". After several escapades, in 1885 he was sectioned after managing to "procure drink", and becoming aggressively excited, remaining confused and incoherent for several days afterwards, and was sent to Sunnyside, Montrose Royal Lunatic Asylum. While there, his depression grew worse, and he began experiencing epileptic seizures and problems with short-term memory loss due to the effects of long term drinking, although he continued to paint. He completed illustrations for the July 1888 edition of the first Sherlock Holmes novel A Study in Scarlet by his son. During his period at the asylum he continued to work, producing volumes of drawings and watercolours in sketchbooks with fantasy themes such as elves, faerie folk, and scenes of death and heavenly redemption, with accompanying notes featuring wordplay and visual puns, described as a "sort of bucolic phantasmagoria: mammoth lilypads and leafy branches, giant birds and mammals, sinister blossoms sheltering demons and damsels alike". Doyle created these illustrations to both protest his confinement and provide evidence of his sanity, sending the drawings to his family as proof that he had been wrongfully committed, writing "Keep steadily in view that this Book is ascribed wholly to the produce of a MADMAN. Whereabouts would you say was the deficiency of intellect? Or depraved taste?" At other times he was more contented, contributing drawings and articles to the asylum's newsletter and sketching the staff. On the 23rd of January 1892 he was admitted as a patient to the Royal Edinburgh Hospital, and remained there until the 26th of May 1892.

In May 1892 he was moved to the Crichton Royal Institution, Dumfries where he died from "a fit during the night" on 10 October 1893.

He was buried in the High Cemetery in Dumfries.

Re-evaluation 

His son, Arthur Conan Doyle, remembered him with affection, describing him in his autobiography as "...full of the tragedy of unfulfilled powers and of underdeveloped gifts. He had his weaknesses, as all of us have ours, but he had also some very remarkable and outstanding virtues". In the Sherlock Holmes story "His Last Bow", from 1917 Holmes uses the name Altamont as an alias. In 1924 he mounted an exhibition of his father's works at the Brook Galleries in London, where they were praised by George Bernard Shaw.

The Doyle Diary, containing a facsimile of works from a sketchbook he created from March to July 1889 while at Montrose, was published in 1978, bringing his work to wider attention and appreciation.

References

General reference

External links

 
 "The spirits of the prisoners" watercolour at National Gallery of NSW

1832 births
1893 deaths
Charles Altamont Doyle
English people of Irish descent
History of mental health in the United Kingdom
19th-century English painters
English male painters
People with epilepsy
People with mental disorders
Charles Altamont